KGMX (106.3 FM, "K-Mix 106.3") is a commercial radio station that is licensed to Lancaster, California and serves the Antelope Valley area. The station is owned by High Desert Broadcasting and broadcasts a top 40 (CHR) format. The station is simulcast on KMVE (106.9 FM) in California City, California.

History
The station first signed on October 28, 1970 as KOTE. Originally owned by Albert Medlinsky, it broadcast a middle of the road music format. On May 24, 1983, KOTE changed its call sign to KKZZ-FM. The station changed its call letters to KGMX on February 14, 1990 to accompany its new adult contemporary format, branded "K-Mix".

In December 1996, Eric-Chandler Communications of Antelope Valley Inc. sold KGMX and sister station KHJJ (1380 AM) to High Desert Broadcasting for $1,437,500. By 2007, KGMX was broadcasting a hot adult contemporary format.

On July 19, 2010, the station adopted the KQAV call letters. Ten days later, on July 29, the station swapped call signs with its sister station on 93.5 FM, reverting to KGMX.

Awards and nominations
KGMX was nominated for a Crystal Radio Award in 1994 for its community service efforts.

References

External links

GMX
Radio stations established in 1970
1970 establishments in California
Contemporary hit radio stations in the United States